Waikanae River is located on the Kapiti Coast in the North Island of New Zealand.

The river drains the western flanks of the Tararua Ranges around Reikorangi and the Akatarawa Valley, then passes to the south of the town of Waikanae to the north of the river and Otaihanga/ Paraparaumu to the south before entering the Tasman Sea at Waikanae - Paraparaumu Beach.  Tributaries include the Maungakotukutuku Stream, Ngatiawa River, and Reikorangi Stream.  The estuary of the river is a significant reserve providing shelter and habitat for local and migratory seabirds. It also provides a major recreational location, both for residents and tourists. Walking and cycling tracks are present on both sides of the river, leading from Waikanae Beach and Otaihanga Domain to the old state highway bridge just south Waikanae.

Water up to a maximum amount is taken out of the river as water supply for Waikanae and Paraparaumu.  This sometimes leads to water restrictions if the river runs low, however in January 2005 the river burst its banks after heavy rain. The river has good water quality and high aquatic biodiversity, but there are occasional blooms of toxic cyanobacteria after prolonged periods of low flow during hot, dry weather.

There have been multiple instances in earlier years (2020, 2021) where the river back has burst, leading to several floods in the elevated areas south of the river. It came with heavy rainfall and heavy storms and cyclones in the area.

The estuary of the Waikanae River is ever changing, with major and minor storms disrupting the banks and causing it to change shape. Prior to storms in 2016/17, the river seamlessly transitioned into the sea, but after storms, long sandbars and banks have caused the river to take an winding path to reach the Tasman Sea.

Bridges 
The first bridge was built about 1885 by the Wellington and Manawatu Railway Company. It was a 3-span timber truss bridge. In 1925 a fence of old rails was built to protect the bridge, backed by fifteen old square iron tanks (sent from East Town), filled with river bed stones. By 1938 the bridge had been rebuilt in steel and concrete.

The next bridge was built nearby and opened in 1901.

The latest bridge is on the Kapiti Expressway.

There are also a couple walking bridges built by the Kapiti Coast District years ago on the river walking paths, such as the Otaihanga Domain Bridge.

References

External links
Photo of the Waikanae River from the Cyclopaedia of New Zealand c1897 
Photo of the Waikanae rail and road bridges and express train on bridge c1939
Photo of the Waikanae rail and road bridges and express train leaving bridge c1938 
South bank of Waikanae River with strata identified
 

Rivers of the Wellington Region
Kapiti Coast District
Rivers of New Zealand